Love Streams is a 1984 American film directed by John Cassavetes, in what would be his final independent feature and penultimate directorial project. The film tells the story of a middle-aged brother (Cassavetes) and sister (Gena Rowlands) who find themselves relying on one another after being abandoned by their loved ones.

The film was entered into the 34th Berlin International Film Festival where it won the Golden Bear.

Plot
Undergoing a messy divorce from a husband and daughter tired of her continuously overwrought emotional states,Sarah Lawson visits her brother Robert Harmon, an alcoholic playboy and writer who is in a relationship with Susan, a professional singer, although he carefully avoids any real emotional commitment to anyone. Robert is visited by his ex-wife, who forces him to take care of their eight-year-old son, whom he has never met, for 24 hours.

Robert's son is terrified by the hedonistic, decadent, womanizing world of his father and begs to be taken home following an overnight trip to Las Vegas filled with gambling and prostitutes. After dropping him off, Robert is beaten up by the boy's stepfather, after which his son testifies his love for Robert.

Fleeing the scene, Robert returns home to take care of his sister, his "best friend." Sarah tries with some success to curb the nihilistic self-destruction of Robert's life  and simultaneously deal with her own depression and divorce. She gets him some animals hope he can give his love to them and Robert struggles between his intense desire to protect his sister and the challenge of accepting her freedom as the necessary cost of love. Finally, after a bizarre dream of being in an opera with her husband and daughter, Sarah feels ready to resume her life and possibly even get her family back, or not. She walks away from the house in the middle of a storm as Robert looks on kind of sadly. He hallucinates that one of the dogs she gave him has turned into a naked man and is waving at him.

Cast
 Gena Rowlands as Sarah Lawson
 John Cassavetes as Robert Harmon
 Diahnne Abbott as Susan
 Seymour Cassel as Jack Lawson
 Margaret Abbott as Margarita
 Jakob Shaw as Albie Swanson
 Eddy Donno as Stepfather Swanson
 Joan Foley as Judge Dunbar
 Al Ruban as Milton Kravitz
 Tom Badal as Sam the lawyer
 Doe Avedon as Mrs. Kiner
 Leslie Hope as Joanie

Production
Love Streams is based on the 1980 play of the same name by Ted Allan, but the correlation between the screenplay and the play is minimal. In the stage production, the role of Robert Harmon was played by Jon Voight; Cassavetes took this role for the film version.

The visual style of the film is decidedly different from Cassavetes's other works; it contains no hand-held camera work (a trademark of his visual style). Much of it was shot inside Cassavetes's home.

Release
Love Streams was originally released with a running time of 141 minutes. It was briefly available on videotape in the mid 1980s in a version cut to 122 minutes by the distributor; one scene was edited and several unusual visual effects (the insertion of black leader and jump cuts) were removed. In 2003, it was released on DVD in France (along with A Child Is Waiting) in its entirety. The 141-minute version received an American DVD and Blu-ray release for the first time in 2014 as part of The Criterion Collection.

Awards
The film was entered into the 34th Berlin International Film Festival where it won the Golden Bear.

Reception
The film has a 100% positive rating based on 16 reviews from critics at the review aggregator website Rotten Tomatoes.

Japanese film director Shinji Aoyama listed Love Streams as one of the Greatest Films of All Time in 2012. He said, "When I think about Cassavetes, I always feel happy. I feel glad that I like movies. I'm sure I will always feel this way until the day I die, and I intend to feel this way too. At the end of Love Streams, Cassavetes smiles as he sees the dog next to him, which turned into a naked man. I live my life always wishing I can smile like that."

Roger Ebert gave the film 4 out of 4 stars, noting: "Viewers raised on trained and tame movies may be uncomfortable in the world of Cassavetes; his films are built around lots of talk and the waving of arms and the invoking of the gods... Sometimes (as in Husbands) the wild truth-telling approach evaporates into a lot of empty talk and play-acting. In Love Streams, it works."

In 2015 the BBC named the film the 63rd greatest American movie ever made.

See also
I'm Almost Not Crazy: John Cassavetes, the Man and His Work

References

Further reading
Carney, Raymond Francis, Junior, The Films of John Cassavetes: Pragmatism, Modernism, and the Movies, Cambridge University Press, 1994.
Carney, Raymond Francis, Junior, (Editor), Cassavetes on Cassavetes, Farrar, Straus, and Giroux, 2001.

External links
 
Love Streams: A Fitful Flow an essay by Dennis Lim at the Criterion Collection
Movie of the Week: Love Streams at the New Yorker

1984 films
American drama films
1980s English-language films
Films directed by John Cassavetes
Golan-Globus films
Golden Bear winners
1984 drama films
American independent films
Films about siblings
Films about dysfunctional families
Films about writers
Films based on Canadian plays
Midlife crisis films
1984 independent films
Films produced by Menahem Golan
Films produced by Yoram Globus
1980s American films